The following is a list of Teen Choice Award winners and nominees for Choice R&B/Hip-Hop Artist. From 2003 to 2010 and 2013, the category is awarded as two separate categories: Choice R&B Artist and Choice Hip-Hop Artist.

Winners and nominees

2000s

2010s

References

RandB Hip-Hop Artist
Hip hop awards